Sheskey is a surname. Notable people with the surname include:
 Linda Sheskey (born 1962), American middle distance runner
 Rusten Sheskey, American police officer

See also
 Sheekey